Gold Strike Resorts was a family of gaming companies based in Jean, Nevada.

History
In 1994, Gold Strike announced a partnership with Mirage Resorts to build a $250-million casino targeted at budget-conscious visitors, on part of the site of the demolished Dunes golf course on the Las Vegas Strip. It ultimately opened in 1996, following the merger, as the Monte Carlo.

Gold Strike Resorts was acquired in 1995 by Circus Circus Enterprises for $450 million in cash and stock. The acquisition did not include the original Gold Strike near Boulder City, because the owners wanted to pass it on to their children.

List of properties
Gold Strike's properties at the time of its acquisition by Circus Circus were:
 Gold Strike Hotel and Casino — Boulder City, Nevada
 Gold Strike Hotel and Gambling Hall — Jean, Nevada
 Grand Victoria Casino — Elgin, Illinois (50% ownership with Hyatt)
 Monte Carlo, Paradise, Nevada (50% owner in partnership with Mirage Resorts)
 Nevada Landing Hotel and Casino — Jean, Nevada
 Railroad Pass Hotel and Casino — Henderson, Nevada

Former properties
 Pioneer Club — Las Vegas, Nevada

References

Defunct companies based in Nevada
Defunct gambling companies
Gambling companies disestablished in 1995
Gambling companies of the United States